BDT may refer to:

 Baker Dearing Educational Trust, educational charity in the United Kingdom
 Ballistic deflection transistor, electronic devices for high-speed integrated circuits
 Bangladeshi taka (ISO 4217 code), the currency of Bangladesh
 Bangladesh Standard Time, sometimes abbreviated BDT to distinguish from British Standard Time (BST).
 BDT Capital Partners, a merchant bank
 The Best Damn Thing, a 2007 album by Avril Lavigne
 Black–Derman–Toy model, a short rate model in mathematical finance
 Bokoto language (ISO 639-3 code), a Gbaya language of the Central African Republic
 Bolshoi Drama Theater (Russian: Большой Драматический Театр имени Г. А. Товстоногова; БДТ), a theater in Saint Petersburg, Russia
 British Dependent Territories, former designation of British Overseas Territories
 Gbadolite Airport (IATA code), Gbadolite, DR Congo